Monk Myre is a small shallow freshwater lochan and is located 2.5 miles southeast of Blairgowrie in Perth and Kinross.

Geography
Monk Myre is of glacial origin and is formed as a type of geographic formation known as a kettle that has partially silted up. The loch is a designated Site of Special Scientific Interest (SSSI), as well as forming part of a Special Area of Conservation.

See also
 List of lochs in Scotland

References

Freshwater lochs of Scotland
Lochs of Perth and Kinross
Tay catchment
Protected areas of Perth and Kinross
Sites of Special Scientific Interest in Scotland
Conservation in the United Kingdom
Special Areas of Conservation in Scotland
Birdwatching sites in Scotland